Hsu Yu-hsiou (born 2 April 1999) is a Taiwanese tennis player.

Hsu has a career high ATP singles ranking of world No. 208 achieved on 9 January 2023. He also has a career high ATP doubles ranking of world No. 163 achieved on 13 June 2022.

Junior career 
As a junior, Hsu achieved a career-high total combined ranking of no.5, reached on 12 June 2017. In 2017, he won the 2017 Australian Open boys' doubles championships title alongside Zhao Lingxi. He then won the 2017 Wimbledon boys' doubles championships title with Axel Geller and impressively also the 2017 US Open boys' doubles championships title with Wu Yibing, holding three out of the four junior grand slam doubles championships simultaneously.

Professional career

2018 
In March 2018, he won his first singles and doubles titles on the ITF Men's Circuit. In the same year, he made his debut for the Chinese Taipei Davis Cup team, where he won his single's tie against Shahin Khaledan of Iran by a score of 4–6, 6–1, [10–8]. This would mark his first appearance as well as his first win at the ATP Tour level. In September, Hsu reached his first career final on the ATP Challenger Tour where he and partner Jimmy Wang lost in the doubles final of the 2018 Kaohsiung Challenger to Yang Tsung-hua and Hsieh Cheng-peng 7–6(7–3), 2–6, [8–10], in an all-Taiwanese final.

2023: Grand Slam debut
Hsu made his Grand Slam debut by qualifying for the 2023 Australian Open, beating Evan Furness, Elias Ymer and Alexandre Muller.

Challengers and Futures/World Tennis Tour finals

Singles: 14 (8–6)

Doubles: 38 (25–13)

Junior Grand Slam finals

Doubles: 3 (3 titles)

References

External links
 
 
 

1999 births
Living people
Taiwanese male tennis players
Australian Open (tennis) junior champions
Wimbledon junior champions
US Open (tennis) junior champions
People from Changhua County
Grand Slam (tennis) champions in boys' doubles
21st-century Taiwanese people